Gender in Bible translation concerns various issues, such as the gender of God and generic antecedents in reference to people. Bruce Metzger states that the English language is so biased towards the male gender that it restricts and obscures  the meaning of the original language, which was more gender-inclusive than a literal translation would convey. Wayne Grudem disagrees, believing that a translation should try to match the words of the original language rather than introduce the translator's opinion as to whether the original words  meant to include both sexes or not, and that trying to be gender-neutral results in vague and contorted writing style. Michael Marlowe argues from a third standpoint, that the Bible is patriarchal, and gender-neutral language distorts its meaning in an attempt by translators like Metzger to impose their progressive modern views on the text. The topic has theological and political undercurrents. Paul Mankowski says that inclusive-language translators are bowing to feminist political taboos rather than trying to translate accurately,  while Marmy Clason says that their opponents are motivated by hostility to feminism rather than fidelity to the original meaning.

The New Revised Standard Version (NRSV) was one of the first major translations to adopt gender-neutral language.  The King James Version translated at least one passage using a technique that many now reject in other translations, "Blessed are the peacemakers, for they shall be called the children of God" (Matt. 5:9). The Greek word υἱοὶ that appears in the original is usually translated as "sons", but in this passage the translators chose to use the term "children" that included both genders. Opponents of gender neutral language believe that readers who are not familiar with the original languages can be influenced by a compromised meaning they believe is feminist.

Translation of the names of God
There are a number of ways to translate the names of God into English from Hebrew. Hebrew uses only four consonants for the name—Yod-Heh-Waw-Heh—hence it is called the Tetragrammaton. Some modern English bibles render this as LORD—L capital, and ord in small capital case. Others use Yahweh, and the old King James Version used Jehovah. In English, outside Bible translations, the tetragrammaton is often written as YHWH or YHVH.

Sometimes this word is rendered into English by using Hebrew , instead of attempting to directly translate , following an ancient Jewish custom of respect.

The Hebrew word  literally means my lord (with pseudo-plural), and is usually translated as Lord.

There are a number of compound names for God.  is translated as Lord of Hosts.  would be Lord God of Hosts. Among non-Orthodox Jews, there is a growing tendency to avoid the gender-in-English-language debate, and to simultaneously reclaim the vocabulary of Hebrew itself, by not translating these names in English prayers.

An example of a traditional translation is:
(Psalm 24)
An alternative translation is:
"The earth belongs to Adonai, and all it contains; the world and its inhabitants."

Third person pronouns for God 
Many prayers use one or more of the names for God many times within the same paragraph. The first time it appears a proper name is used, while further instances use a third person pronoun (he, she or it). English speakers usually use masculine or feminine third person pronouns to refer to people and animals, and the third person pronoun—"it"—to refer to (inanimate) objects. Traditionally, in Jewish, Christian, and Muslim writing, the third-person pronoun "He" has been used to refer to God in English translations.  In non-religious contexts, English speakers have generally used the word "he" as a substitute for a gender-neutral third person pronoun.

The idea of God being an "It" rather than a "he" or "she" does have some support in Jewish, Christian and Islamic rationalist medieval thought, much of which was based on Neo-Aristotelian philosophy. Some medieval philosophers of all three of these religions took great pains to make clear that God was in no way like a person, and that all apparently physical descriptions of God were only poetic metaphors.

In the Chinese language, translators of the Christian Bible have created a new Chinese character to act as a divine pronoun: . , in essence, is the universal third person pronoun for all objects and persons. However, personhood (as well as gender) can be distinguished in writing. The normal pronoun for he, is also used in generic cases. The radical  marks personhood (distinct from non-human referents), not simply gender alone.

See also
Bible version debate

References

Bibliography
 Kimbrough, ST Jr.. 'Bible Translation and the Gender of God'. Theology Today (1989): 195-202.
 Piper, John and Wayne A Grudem (eds). Recovering Biblical Manhood and Womanhood: [https://web.archive.org/web/20070731055737/http://www.cbmw.org/rbmw/rbmw.pdf A Response to Evangelical Feminism.] Wheaton, Illinois: Crossway Books, 1991.
 Poythress, Vern Sheriden and Wayne A Grudem. The Gender-Neutral Bible Controversy: Muting the Masculinity of God's Words. Nashville, Tennessee: Broadman & Holman Publishers, 2000.
 Poythress, Vern Sheriden. 'Gender in Bible Translation: Exploring a Connection with Male Representatives'. Westminster Theological Journal (1998): 225-53.
 Reimers, Paula. 'Feminism, Judaism, and God the Mother'. Conservative Judaism (1993).

Bible versions and translations
Gender in the Bible
Feminist theology